Arina Aleksandrovna Surkova (born 17 July 1998) is a Russian swimmer specializing in freestyle and butterfly. She won two bronze medals at the 2018 World Championships (25 m).

Career 

Surkova is coached by Alexander Martynov.

She was selected as a part of Russian team for 2018 World Championships (25 m) in China. She swam in prelims and then Russian team won bronze medal so Arina also became a bronze medallist. Then she won a second bronze medal at mixed medley relay.

In 2019, she represented Russia at the 2019 World Aquatics Championships held in Gwangju, South Korea.

Arina was part of the New York Breakers Team of the International Swimming League in 2020.

References

External links 
 Arina Surkova  at the Russian Swimming Federation website

1998 births
Living people
Russian female swimmers
Russian female butterfly swimmers
Russian female freestyle swimmers
Medalists at the FINA World Swimming Championships (25 m)
European Aquatics Championships medalists in swimming
Swimmers at the 2020 Summer Olympics
Place of birth missing (living people)
People from Novokuznetsk
Sportspeople from Kemerovo Oblast